Bailando por un Sueño 2 was the second Argentine season of Bailando por un Sueño.

The first show of the season aired on July 3, 2006 and was part of the original show broadcast as Showmatch  on Canal 13, and hosted by Marcelo Tinelli, as well as the previous season, that had finished a month before. This time there were 12 couples competing, and the competition lasted 13 weeks. The winner was revealed on the season finale, on September 25, 2006 and it was the actress, and comedian Florencia de la V, who was paired with the professional dancer, Manuel Rodríguez.

The judges were the same as in season one: journalist Jorge Lafauci, professional dancer Laura Fidalgo (who later competed on the show), vedette Zulma Faiad, and producer, actress and singer Reina Reech.

Couples

Scoring chart

Red numbers indicate the lowest score for each week.
Green numbers indicate the highest score for each week.
 indicates the couple eliminated that week.
 indicates the couple was saved by the public.
 indicates the winning couple.
 indicates the runner-up couple.
 indicates the semi-finalists couples.

Highest and lowest scoring performances 
The best and worst performances in each dance according to the judges' marks are as follows:

Dance schedule 
 Week 1: Salsa or Jazz
 Week 2: Cha cha cha or Disco
 Week 3: Milonga or Hip Hop
 Week 4: Rock and roll or Chacarera
 Week 5: Charleston or Pasodoble
 Week 6: Waltz or Swing
 Week 7: Chamamé or Merengue
 Week 8: Axé music or Tango
 Week 9: Mambo or Flamenco (non-elimination week)
 Week 10 (1st Semi-final): Flamenco, Rock and roll and Disco
 Week 10 (2nd Semi-final): Mambo, Swing and Milonga
 Week 10 (Final): Lambada, Waltz and Charleston

Dance chart 

 Highest scoring dance.
 Lowest scoring dance.
 Performed but not scored.

Argentina
Argentine variety television shows
2006 Argentine television seasons